Cryphaea is a monotypic moth genus in the family Geometridae. Its single species, Cryphaea xylina, is found in Australia. Both the genus and species were first described by Turner in 1917.

References

Ennominae
Monotypic moth genera